Babacar is a 1987 music album by France Gall with music and lyrics by Michel Berger. It is certified Diamond.

Track listing
All tracks composed by Michel Berger

Charts (1987)

Certifications and sales

References 

1987 albums
France Gall albums
Warner Music Group albums
Albums produced by Michel Berger